The equestrian statue of Arthur Wellesley, 1st Duke of Wellington located outside the Royal Exchange, now known as the Gallery of Modern Art, Glasgow, Scotland, is one of Glasgow's most iconic landmarks.

It was sculpted by Italian artist Carlo Marochetti and erected in 1844, thanks to public subscription to mark the successful end in 1815 of the long French Revolutionary Wars and the Napoleonic Wars. Since at least the 1980s it has been traditionally capped with a traffic cone by members of the public. The statue is a Category A listed sculpture.

Statue

The statue of the Duke on his favourite horse Copenhagen was sculpted by Italian artist Carlo Marochetti and erected in 1844. The statue is a Category-A listed monument.

Traffic cone
In recent times the statue has become known for being capped with a traffic cone. Adorning the statue with a cone had continued over many years: the act was claimed to represent the humour of the local population and was believed to date back to the 1980s, if not before.

In 2005, Glasgow City Council and Strathclyde Police took a stance of asking the public not to replace the cone, citing minor damage to the statue and the potential for injury when attempting to place a cone.

In 2011 the Lonely Planet guide included the statue in its list of the "top 10 most bizarre monuments on Earth".

Their planning application contained an estimate that the cost of removing traffic cones from the statue was £100 per callout, and that this could amount to £10,000 a year. The plans were withdrawn after widespread public opposition, including an online petition that received over 10,000 signatures. As the council indicated that action against the practice could still be considered, the art-political organization National Collective organised a rally in defence of the cone.

In 2014, in support of the Scottish Independence referendum, the statue was fitted with a "Yes" cone as well as a flag fitted in the statue's stirrup.

The cone was replaced with a gold painted one during the 2012 Olympics as a celebration of Scotland's contribution to the record haul of gold medals won by Team GB. A replica of the statue, complete with cone, appeared at the 2014 Commonwealth Games opening ceremony, and a gold cone was then again placed on the statue to mark the success of the games.

In 2015, Glasgow City Council tested hi-tech CCTV software worth £1.2m, checking to see whether it could automatically detect people putting cones on the statue, which it could.

On Brexit Day (31 January 2020) pro-European supporters placed a cone painted to represent the EU flag on the statue's head.

In March 2022, in support of Ukraine and as a protest against Russia's invasion of it, the statue was fitted with a cone with the colours of the Ukrainian flag.

See also
 List of Category A listed buildings in Glasgow
 Public statues in Glasgow
 List of monuments to Arthur Wellesley, 1st Duke of Wellington

References

External links

Further reading
 

1844 in Scotland
1844 sculptures
Category A listed buildings in Glasgow
Culture in Glasgow
Equestrian statues in the United Kingdom
Listed sculptures in Scotland
Outdoor sculptures in Scotland
Scottish humour
British military memorials and cemeteries
Monuments and memorials in Glasgow
Terminating vistas in the United Kingdom
Works by Italian people
Glasgow
Wellington, Glasgow